Up the Walls of the World is a 1978 science fiction novel by American author Alice Sheldon, who wrote under the pen name of James Tiptree, Jr. It was the first novel she published, having until then worked and built a reputation only in the field of short stories.

The novel explores the possibility that telepathy and other psychic phenomena are real. It describes an attempt to invade Earth by beings with advanced telepathic abilities from the planet Tyree.

The book considers the subject of sentience in different life forms inhabiting widely different environments; in computers; and in a vast sentient inhabitant of deep space formed of a network of widely spaced nodes.

The story takes place in 3 settings which unfold together:
 On Earth, at a telepathy lab run by the US Navy.
 On the planet Tyree, a life-rich gas giant inhabited by intelligent beings resembling manta rays or cuttlefish which ride the air currents of its vast atmosphere.
 In deep space, the Destroyer, an intelligent entity larger than a solar system but only slightly denser than the vacuum of space and composed of countless linked nodes.

External links
 
 

1978 American novels
1978 science fiction novels
American science fiction novels
Berkley Books books
Works by James Tiptree Jr.